Yolanda Mateos Franco (born 1972) is a Spanish former footballer who played as a winger for Eibartarrak FT, Levante UD and CE Sabadell in the Superliga. She was a member of the Spain women's national football team, and she took part in the 1997 European Championship. She scored the goal in the qualifying play-offs against England that qualified Spain for the tournament for the first time.

International goals

References

1972 births
Living people
Spanish women's footballers
Spain women's international footballers
Primera División (women) players
SD Eibar Femenino players
Levante UD Femenino players
CE Sabadell Femení players
Women's association football wingers